These are the results for men aged 45 to 49 at the eighteenth European Masters Athletics Championships, held in Zittau, Germany; Zgorzelec, Poland; and Hrádek nad Nisou, Czech Republic, from August 16–25, 2012. The European Masters Athletics Championships are an athletics competition for people over 35 years of age, referred to as masters athletics.

Fewer countries participated compared with the previous championships in Nyiregyhaza, but over 700 more athletes participated, giving it the third-largest attendance of any championship run by European Masters Athletics.

Results

100 metres

200 metres

400 metres

800 metres

1500 metres

5000 metres 

Note:  Original winner Wieslaw Pietka  was disqualified after a positive drug test

10000 metres

110 metres hurdles

400 metres hurdles

3000 metres steeplechase 

Note:  Original winner Wieslaw Pietka  was disqualified after a positive drug test

4x100 metres relay

4x400 metres relay

Marathon

High jump

Pole vault

Long jump

Triple jump

Shot put

Discus throw

Hammer throw

Javelin throw

Weight throw

Throws pentathlon

Decathlon

5000 metre track race walk

20000 metre road race walk

References 

 

2012 European Masters Athletics Championships